Pakistan Security Printing Corporation (Pvt.) Limited (PSPC) is a wholly owned subsidiary of the State Bank of Pakistan and prints security products such as Pakistani banknotes and prize bonds for the federal government. Pakistan Security Printing Corporation was established as a joint venture company by Government of Pakistan on March 10, 1949, with M/s Thomas De La Rue International of United Kingdom. 

Over the years, PSPC underwent several expansion programs and enhancement of its own portfolio. This included establishment of a security paper manufacturing company known as, Security Papers Limited (SPL) in 1965, of which PSPC is currently the majority shareholder. The creation of SPL removed PSPC’s dependence on imported security paper. Similarly, PSPC also underwent a joint venture with SICPA, a renowned manufacturer of security inks for currencies and sensitive documents, to establish a private limited company known as SICPA Pakistan which solely focuses on manufacturing inks for security products in Pakistan.

Initially, PSPC was involved in the printing of security products such as banknotes, prize bonds, stamp papers, degree documents, machine readable passports, cheque books and stamps etc., however, in July 2017, State Bank of Pakistan acquired the company along with operations of Banknote and Prize Bond printing from the Ministry of Finance for Rs.100 Billion. A separate company known as 'National Security Printing Company (NSPC)', was established under the umbrella of Ministry of Finance to print other security products.

References

State Bank of Pakistan
Banknote printing companies
Publishing companies established in 1949
2017 mergers and acquisitions
Manufacturing companies based in Karachi
Pakistani companies established in 1949